The Happy Hooker Goes to Washington is a 1977 American comedy film directed by William A. Levey.  It was the sequel to The Happy Hooker, which was released in 1975. Joey Heatherton replaced Lynn Redgrave as the lead character of Xaviera Hollander.

The film's tagline was, "She served her country... the only way she knew how!"

George Hamilton, Joe E. Ross, Larry Storch and Rip Taylor are among the most prominent individuals who made cameo appearances.

Plot
World-famous prostitute Xaviera Hollander is called to testify in front of the United States Congress.

Principal cast

Additional information
This film was also released under the following titles:
 En Washington los senadores están calientes - Spain
 Happy Hooker Vai a Washington - Brazil
 Xaviera Washingtonissa - Finland

See also
 List of American films of 1977
 The Happy Hooker (1975)
 The Happy Hooker Goes Hollywood (1980)

External links
 
 
 

1977 films
American comedy films
1970s English-language films
Films about prostitution in the United States
Films set in Washington, D.C.
Films shot in Washington, D.C.
1977 comedy films
Golan-Globus films
Cultural depictions of Xaviera Hollander
1970s American films